The Iran Nonproliferation Act of 2000 is a United States Act of Congress signed into law by President Bill Clinton on March 14, 2000. The act authorizes the President of the United States to take punitive action against individuals or organizations known to be providing material aid to weapons of mass destruction programs in Iran.

Amendment to 2000 Act
U.S. Congressional amendment to the Iran Nonproliferation Act of 2000.

See also
 Chemical Weapons Convention
 International Emergency Economic Powers Act
 Missile Technology Control Regime
 Nuclear Non-Proliferation Act of 1978
 Nuclear Suppliers Group
 Wassenaar Arrangement

References

External links
 Text of the Act
 Clinton Signs 'Iran Nonproliferation Act'
 

United States foreign relations legislation
United States federal trade legislation
Acts of the 106th United States Congress
2000 in international relations
Iran–United States relations
Nuclear program of Iran
Sanctions against Iran
Sanctions legislation
United States sanctions